Anders Tommy Christensson (born 7 March 1973) is a Swedish rower. He competed in the men's lightweight double sculls event at the 1996 Summer Olympics.

References

External links
 

1973 births
Living people
Swedish male rowers
Olympic rowers of Sweden
Rowers at the 1996 Summer Olympics
People from Ängelholm Municipality
Sportspeople from Skåne County